Munyaradzi is a common name in Zimbabwe which means "comforter" in the Shona language. The name can also be shortened to Munya.

Notable persons with that name include:

Munyaradzi Chidzonga (born 1986), Zimbabwean actor, filmmaker and entrepreneur.
Munyaradzi Gwisai, Zimbabwean politician
Henry Munyaradzi (1913–1998), Zimbabwean sculptor

See also 
 Munya (disambiguation)